Đorđe Ćurčić (born 10 July 2004), also credited to as Đorđe V. Ćurčić, is a Serbian professional basketball player for Borac Čačak of the Basketball League of Serbia and the ABA League.

Professional career 
Ćurčić grew up with a youth system of his hometown club Borac. On 25 September 2021, Ćurčić made his ABA League debut in a 91–89 loss to Igokea m:tel with no records in 3 minutes of playing time. On 14 July 2022, Ćurčić signed a four-year contract with Borac, making his first processional contract.

National team career 
In August 2021, Ćurčić was a member of the Serbia U-18 at the FIBA U18 European Challengers in Skopje, North Macedonia. Over five tournament games, he averaged 12.6 points, 2.4 rebounds, and 2.8 assists per game. In July and August 2022, Ćurčić was a member of the under-18 team at the FIBA U18 European Championship in İzmir, Turkey. Over seven tournament games, he averaged 10.9 points, 3.0 rebounds, and 1.4 assists per game.

References

External links 
 Player Profile at ABA League
 Player Profile at eurobasket.com
 Player Profile at realgm.com
 Player Profile at proballers.com
 Player Profile at kkborac.rs

2004 births
Living people
ABA League players
Basketball League of Serbia players
Basketball players from Čačak
KK Borac Čačak players
KK Čačak 94 players
Serbian men's basketball players